The Honda Fault ( is a reverse sinistral oblique strike-slip fault in the departments of Tolima, Caldas and Cundinamarca in central Colombia.

Etymology 
The fault is named after Honda, Tolima.

Description 
The Honda Fault extends through the Middle Magdalena Valley, close to the Magdalena River and the cities of Ambalema, Honda, and La Dorada. It offsets beds of the Miocene Honda Group, Pliocene Mesa Formation, and Quaternary sediment in alluvial terraces. The fault trace is characterised by continuous prominent scarps, aligned drainages, fault saddles, linear ridges and valleys, sag ponds, degraded scarps, and localized uplifts.

See also 

 List of earthquakes in Colombia
 Ibagué Fault
 Romeral Fault System

References

Bibliography

Maps 
 

Seismic faults of Colombia
Strike-slip faults
Thrust faults
Inactive faults
Faults
Faults
Faults